The following is a list of ballets by Danish dancer, choreographer and ballet master Vincenzo Galeotti (1733–1816).

 The King Hunting (20 October 1775), ballet in two acts
 The Peasants and the Lords of Lystgaarden (15 December 1775), ballet in one act music by Paolo Scalabrini (1713–1803)
 Zigeunernes Camp (30 January 1776), ballet in four acts
 Slavindehandleren (10 October 1776), ballet in one act
 Cupid's Sweet Revenge (29 October 1776), ballet in one act
 Mary Bones Garden in London (13 December 1776), ballet in one act
 The Victim Sofi (21 February 1777), ballet in one act
 The Disguised Dido (24 October 1777), heroic ballet in one act
 Betlersken (16 December 1777), ballet in one act
 The Art Vanquished by Love (30 January 1778), ballet in one act
 Statuen or the Useless Witchcraft (26 November 1778), ballet in one act
 Linna and Walvais (30 January 1779), ballet in one act
 The Magnanimous Turk (26 October 1779), ballet in one act
 L'Orphelin de la Chine (14 January 1780), ballet in one act 
 Harp Player (2 March 1780), ballet in one act 
 Love and Mista Ken Power (3 November 1780), ballet in four acts, music by Claus Schall (1757–1835)	
 Milliner Indians (19 December 1780), ballet in one act
 Savoyardinderne (12 June 1781), ballet in one act, music by Claus Schall (1757–1835)
 Don Juan (29 October 1781), ballet in one act
 The Betrayed and Avenged Cupid (6 December 1781), ballet in one act, music by Claus Schall (1757–1835)
 Herman and Dolmon or Goddædighed and gratitude (11 April 1782), ballet in one act, music by Claus Schall (1757–1835)
 The Unexpected Help (6 December 1782), ballet in one act, music by Claus Schall music by Claus Schall (1757–1835)
 The Suspicious Wife (19 December 1782), ballet in one act, music by Claus Schall music by Claus Schall (1757–1835)
 Witch Master and the Charitable Fe (25 April 1783), ballet in one act
 The Lovers, Protected by Cupid (22 December 1783), ballet in one act
 Angelica and Medoro (30 January 1784), ballet in one act, music by Jens Lolle music by Jens Lolle (1751–1789)
 The Offenders Ignorance or Artists' Victory (23 September 1784), ballet in one act, music by Jens Lolle (1751–1789)
 Cupid and Psyche (3 December 1784), allegorical ballet in one act, music by Claus Schall music by Claus Schall (1757–1835)
 Laurette or The improved Seducer (11 February 1785), pantomime ballet in two acts, music by Claus Schall (1757–1835)
 Cupid and the Ballet Master Luner (31 October 1786), ballet in one act, music by Jens Lolle (1751–1789)
 Semiramis (30 January 1787), tragic pantomime-ballet in five acts, the music of darbe
 Laundry Girls and Keddelflikkeren (15 January 1788), comic ballet in three acts, music by Claus Schall (1757–1835)
 Idol of Ceylon (29 April 1788), comic ballet in four acts, music by Claus Schall music by Claus Schall (1757–1835)
 Positions Transferee (1788)
 Task Eren (30 September 1788), comic ballet in one act, Music by Claus Schall arranged by P. Larcher.
 Aline, Queen of Golkonda (2 February 1789), opera in three acts, music by JAP Schulz (1747–1800)
 The Feigned Deaf (28 October 1790), ballet in one act
 Transformation Provided or the Devil is Loose (2 September 1791), ballet in 3 Acts, music by Claus Schall (1757–1835)
 China Dangers (2 March 1792), sing piece in two acts, music by Claus Schall (1757–1835), composed by Vuncenzo Galeotti, by PA Heiberg(1758–1841) 
 Telemak on Calypso's Island (28 December 1792), opera-Ballet in four acts, poetry by Chr. Barge, music of Maria Theresia Ahlefeldt- (1755–1810)
 Peter's Wedding (12 December 1793), sing piece in two acts, music by JAP Schulz (1747–1800)
 Machinisten (16 October 1795)
 Waverer or Enchanted Malerie (6 May 1796), ballet in one act of Vincenzo Galeotti, music by Claus Schall (1757–1835)
 Annette and Lubin (18 September 1797), ballet in one act by, music by Claus Schall (1757–1835)
 Herman von Unna (30 January 1800), drama in 5 Acts of AF Skjöldebrand (1757–1834, languages: Swedish ). Music by GJ Vogler (1749–1814, Language: German), Dance of Vincenzo Galeotti
 Cupid and Psyche (1801)
 Lagertha (30 January 1801), pantomime tragedy mixed with singing in three acts, verses of C. Pram, music by Claus Schall (1757–1835)
 Bjærgbøndernes Children and mirror (23 September 1802), comic ballet in two acts, music by Claus Schall (1757–1835)
 Nina or the Lunatic of Love (26 November 1802), ballet [later: Pantomime-Ballet] in 2 Acts, music by Claus Schall (1757–1835)
 Ines de Castro (30 January 1804), tragic pantomime-ballet in five acts, music by Claus Schall (1757–1835)
 Laurette or Improved Seducer (1804 )
 Gyrithe or Danmaraks Salvation Ancestral (30 January 1807), domestic drama with Corinthians in 4 Acts by Lauritz Kruse (1778–1839) with music by FLAe. Kunzen (1761–1817) and Dance of Vincenzo Galeotti
 Rolf Bluebeard (13 December 1808), tragic ballet in four acts, music by Claus Schall (1757–1835)
 Morning Hour (1809)
 Dream (29 January 1810), pantomime prologue to King Frederick certain Birthday of Vincenzo Galeotti, music by Claus Schall (1757–1835)
 Romeo and Giulietta (2 April 1811), tragic ballet in five acts, music by Claus Schall (1757–1835)
 Koromanien or Dansesygen (29 October 1811), comic ballet in two acts, music by Claus Schall (1757–1835)
 Choromanien (1811)
 Cendrillon or The Little Green Shoes (29 October 1812), lyrical magic play in 3 Acts of CG Etienne. music by George Zinck (1788–1828)
 Alma and Elfride or Forest by Hermannstad (29 January 1813), sing piece in 3 Acts, music by Claus Schall (1757–1835),ext by Sophie Cottin (1770–1807, languages: French), dance of Antoine Bournonville (1760–1843)
 Zigeuneres Camp (1813)
 The Hut in the Black Forest (31 January 1814), sing piece in 3 Acts, music by Carl Braun (1788–1835),Text of anonymous French (language: French), translated by Niels Thoroup Bruun (1778–1823)
 Macbeth'' (2 April 1816), tragic ballet in five acts by Vincenzo Galeotti, music by Claus Schall (1757–1835)

References
 Dansk Biografisk Leksikon
 Danske Litteraturpriser website

Galeotti, Vincenzo